Tamupiwa Dimairo (born 22 March 1996) is a footballer who plays as a defender for Bruno's Magpies in the Gibraltar National League, having previously played for Wellington Phoenix and Michigan Bucks.

On 26 August 2015, he made his professional senior debut for Wellington Phoenix FC in the 2015 FFA Cup against Melbourne City.

He has represented New Zealand at under-17 level, playing at the 2013 FIFA U-17 World Cup in the United Arab Emirates.

External links

References

1996 births
Living people
Association football defenders
Association football midfielders
Expatriate soccer players in the United States
New Zealand association footballers
New Zealand expatriate association footballers
New Zealand expatriate sportspeople in the United States
New Zealand Football Championship players
New Zealand people of Zimbabwean descent
New Zealand under-20 international footballers
New Zealand youth international footballers
OKC Energy FC players
Sportspeople from Kwekwe
Wellington Phoenix FC players
Zimbabwean footballers
Zimbabwean emigrants to New Zealand
Zimbabwean expatriate footballers
Zimbabwean expatriate sportspeople in the United States